The International 2015 (TI5) was the fifth edition of The International, an annual Dota 2 esports championship tournament, which took place at the KeyArena in Seattle. Hosted by Valve, the game's developer, the tournament began in May with the qualifier phase and ended after the main event in August.

The tournament awarded one of the biggest prize pools in esports tournament history, at over 18 million, with the winning team, Evil Geniuses, being awarded over $6 million.

Background
Valve announced The International 2015 in January 2015, again taking place at the KeyArena in Seattle. Tickets went on sale in March, selling out in around 5 minutes.

An interactive compendium was again announced, being released in May 2015, with purchases of the compendium going towards the tournament's prize pool. By June, the prize pool had passed the previous year's total of $11 million, overtaking it as the largest esports prize pool in history at the time, and with 60 days of funding remaining. Valve anticipated that the total would exceed $15 million by the time of the tournament, a target which was reached in July. Purchasers who reach a high enough level with their compendium were sent a miniature replica International trophy.

The tournament's games began on July 26, with the wild card matches, followed by four days of a round robin format group stage being played as best of two matches. The main brackets then began on August 3.

During the second day of the tournament, a DDOS attack was reported to have occurred, affecting around three hours of games.

Teams 
Ten professional teams were directly invited to the event, with four regional winners and two 'wild card' winners also invited. The 'wild card' winners were decided during the main competition in Seattle from CDEC Gaming, Team Archon, MVP Phoenix and Vega Squadron.

Bracket

The tournament's first day of games began on July 26 with four teams competing for the two wild card spots. The winners of the upper and lower brackets, CDEC and MVP Phoenix, gained these positions in the main tournament.

Wild card

Group stage

Group A

Group B

Main event

Results 

(Note: Prizes are in USD)

References

External links

 

2015
2015 in esports
2015 in sports in Washington (state)
August 2015 sports events in the United States
Sports competitions in Seattle
International esports competitions hosted by the United States